Audra Simpson is a political anthropologist at Columbia University. Her work engages with Indigenous politics in the United States of America and Canada and cuts across anthropology, Indigenous studies, American and Canadian studies, gender and sexuality, and political science. She is the author of Mohawk Interruptus: Political Life Across the Borders of Settler States which won the Sharon Stephens Prize in 2015 awarded by the American Ethnological Society.

Early life 

Audra Simpson is a citizen of the Kahnawà:ke Mohawk Nation.

She completed her BA in Anthropology from Concordia University in 1993. She then joined the MA program in Anthropology at McGill University. She received her PhD in Anthropology from McGill in 2004.

Teaching 
Simpson received the Provost's Diversity Post-Doctoral Fellowship at Cornell University after completing her PhD. Shortly after, she was hired to the Anthropology Department and American Indian Program at the university. She stayed at Cornell for three years.

In July 2008, Simpson joined Columbia University as Assistant Professor of Anthropology. At the start, she refused cross appointment within the university until she was tenured. However, she supported the university's Center for the Study of Ethnicity and Race from her initial months. She continues her association with the center as its only core Indigenous faculty member.

From Spring 2017 to February 2022, Simpson was the sole Native American faculty member at Columbia. This makes the situation at the university's Center for the Study of Ethnicity and Race precarious for students. The university has been unable to provide junior faculty with adequate incentive to work at Columbia.

Research and writing

Mohawk Interruptus: Political Life Across the Borders of Settler States 
While doing her PhD in Anthropology at McGill University, she received the American Anthropological Association's Minority Dissertation Award in 2002. This provided her time and funding to write her PhD dissertation. In 2003, she defended her PhD thesis titled To the Reserve and Back Again: Kahnawake Mohawk Narratives of Self, Home and Nation. Its central question was, "What other narratives of nationhood and citizenship are there than those of membership in the American or Canadian states?"

Her thesis examined the [w]ays in which residence, location, movement and political discourses distill into a mobile and collective 'identity' for Mohawks of Kahnawake and other Iroquois peoples across the borders on their reserves and the state that surround them. Throughout her research, she visited Manhattan, Brooklyn, Kahnawà:ke, Châteauguay, and Montreal. Her PhD thesis took the shape of her first book Mohawk Interruptus through a book contract with Duke University Press. The book interrogates settler colonial and anthropological practices in United States and Canada that have circumscribed Iroquoian identities to ignore 'contested interpretations of indigeneity' and erase Indigenous nationhood.

Anthropologist Ian Kalman wrote that the book defies all constraints of simplification just as the people of Kahnawake. It is 'simultaneously engaging and densely layered.' Kalman acknowledges that he has been using Simpson's dissertation as well as journal articles that informs the book as teaching material for years. As a testimony to the excellence of the book, he declares that he will add it to his syllabus. "It is an essential read for any study of settler colonialism, native/indigenous/first-nation studies, or the study of sovereignty, and also stands on its own as an important narrative of North America's ongoing colonial history." Ngāti Pūkenga Professor Brendan Hokowhitu praises the book as 'the complexities of Indigenous life in... are given neither the security of romanticization nor the comfort of the scholarly pulpit.' Prof. David Martínez, American Indian Studies, foretells that the book will assert its place in the Haudenosaunee canon. It will compel new scholars to look closely at the ways Indigenous communities struggle to maintain political integrity under borders and laws created by settler states.

Anthropologist Lisa K. Neuman opines that the book is significant for researchers and scholars in various disciplines in social sciences, It teaches how to understand Indigenous lived experiences around membership, citizenship and nationhood 'without replicating colonial projects of erasure' in academic research.

In 2014, the book received an Honourable Mention for the Delmos Jones and Jagna Sharif Memorial Book Prize presented by Critical Study of North America from the Society for the Anthropology of North America (part of the American Anthropological Association). In 2015, the book won the Lora Romero Best First Book Publication Prize from the American Studies Association. Simpson accepted the Native American and Indigenous Studies Association's (NAISA) First Book Prize to a standing ovation and loud cheers from the audience.

References

Works cited 

 
 

American anthropologists
American women anthropologists
American women academics
American ethnographers
Mohawk people
Indigenous writers of the Americas
1969 births
Living people
Columbia University faculty
Cornell University faculty
Concordia University alumni
McGill University alumni